Camille Ruest (born November 23, 1993) is a Canadian retired competitive pair skater. With her skating partner, Andrew Wolfe, she is the 2019 Canadian national bronze medallist, and has represented Canada at the Four Continents and World Championships, placing eighteenth at the  2018 World Championships in Milan.

Personal life 
Ruest was born on November 23, 1993, in Rimouski, Quebec. She is the daughter of  Édith Lévesque and Claude Ruest. She studied at Cégep de Sorel-Tracy.

Career

Single skating 
Ruest began learning to skate in 1997. She competed mainly in ladies' singles until the end of the 2014–2015 season, placing 17th in the senior ranks at the 2014 Canadian Championships. She was coached by Annie Barabé and Sophie Richard in Contrecœur, Quebec.

Pair skating 
Ruest trained in pair skating for two years beginning when she was 15 years old. She competed with Marc-Antoine Laporte in the pre-novice ranks in the 2009–2010 season. She spent the next few seasons focusing on singles.

Having decided to return to pairs, Ruest teamed up with Samuel Morais in April 2014. They placed 6th in the junior pairs' event at the 2015 Canadian Championships. The pair was coached by Annie Barabé in Contrecœur, Quebec.
Ruest teamed up with Andrew Wolfe in September 2015. They trained but did not compete during their first season together.

2016–17 season
Ruest and Wolfe debuted in international competition at the 2016 CS Autumn Classic International, where they placed fourth.  They then made their Grand Prix debut, placing sixth at the 2016 Rostelecom Cup.  Their season concluded at the 2017 Canadian Championships, where they placed fifth.

2017–18 season
After beginning the season with a tenth-place finish at the 2017 CS Nebelhorn Trophy, Ruest and Wolfe did not compete on the Grand Prix.  The finished sixth at the 2018 Canadian Championships.  As the top three finishers were sent to the 2018 Winter Olympics, Ruest and Wolfe earned their first ISU Championship assignment, the 2018 Four Continents Championships in Taipei, where they finished seventh.

Following the retirement of Meagan Duhamel and Eric Radford, they were sent to the 2018 World Championships in Milan, where they finished eighteenth.  They later credited the experience of competing at the World Championships as motivating them to keep improving.

2018–19 season
Ruest and Wolfe began their season at the 2018 U.S. International Classic, where they finished fifth.  Assigned to two Grand Prix events, they finished eighth at the 2018 Skate Canada International and fifth at the 2018 Internationaux de France.  

At the 2019 Canadian Championships, they won the bronze medal, placing third in the short program and fourth in the free skate, despite an aborted lift.  They were named to Canada's team for the 2019 Four Continents Championships.  They finished eighth there.

2019–20 season
Following the end of the 2018–19 season, Ruest underwent knee surgery.  Returning to competition at the 2019 U.S. Classic, Ruest/Wolfe placed seventh.  At their first Grand Prix assignment, 2019 Skate America, Ruest/Wolfe placed sixth.  Shortly after the competition, Ruest was diagnosed with a new labral tear in her hip.  They were sixth as well at the 2019 Internationaux de France.

2020–21 season 
Ruest/Wolfe were assigned to the 2020 Skate Canada International, but the event was cancelled as a result of the coronavirus pandemic.

On May 28, 2021, Ruest and Wolfe announced that they would be retiring from competitive skating, as Ruest's ongoing hip issues made continuing dangerous.

Programs 
With Wolfe

Competitive highlights 
GP: Grand Prix; CS: Challenger Series

Pairs with Wolfe

Pairs with Morais

Ladies' singles

References

External links 
 

1993 births
Canadian female pair skaters
Living people
People from Rimouski